Frankie J. Holden  (born Peter Brian; 18 December 1952) , also known as Frank Holden, is an Australian singer, actor and TV presenter. In the 1970s, he fronted Ol' 55, which had a hit with "On the Prowl" from their debut album, Take It Greasy which peaked at number three on the Australian Kent Music Report Albums Chart in 1976. For Return Home Holden was nominated for Best Actor in a Lead Role at the 1990 AFI Awards.

Singing career 

During the 1970s, Holden was the frontman for the Australian retro-rock band Ol' 55, which also included Wilbur Wilde and Jimmy Manzie. In the early 2000s, Holden re-emerged on the music scene with the Ol' Skydaddies, a band featuring members from Ol' 55, Daddy Cool and Skyhooks.

Television career

Actor
In the 1980s, Holden appeared in two episodes of Channel Ten's drama series Prisoner (1982–1983), all episodes of c/o The Bartons and in the first season of the Channel 7 children's program Round the Twist (1989).

In 1990, Holden appeared in the Australian caper film The Big Steal as a used car salesman named "Frank" and as Arthur 'Ozzie' Oswald in The Flying Doctors.

In the early 1990s, he appeared in four episodes on the Seven Network's A Country Practice, and in 1992 starred in the short-lived Late for School.

He then played Senior Sergeant Glenn "Spider" Webb on the ABC's Police Rescue (1994–1996). The series was about the New South Wales Police Rescue Squad based in Sydney.

In 1996 he appeared in four episodes on Seven's police drama Blue Heelers as Senior Detective Jack Woodley. In 1999, he appeared in an episode of Halifax f.p..

From 2000 until 2002, he played ex-cop, then local publican, Stuart McGregor in ABC1's Something in the Air. This series was notable for its high output, producing 320 episodes in just two seasons.

In 2008, Holden was in two Nine Network dramas – Underbelly and The Strip.

In 2013, Holden joined the cast of Seven's A Place to Call Home, a drama set in rural Australia in the 1950s. He plays the part of Roy Briggs, described as "a rugged, unbreakable man capable of charm, good humour as well as a crusty grumpiness".

In 2022, Holden played the role of Ted Grimley, father of Melissa Caddick, in the Nine Network drama Underbelly: Vanishing Act.

Presenter
From 1996 until 1998, Holden was the host of the revamped Monday evening variety show In Melbourne Tonight, co-featuring Julia Morris and Denise Drysdale. For the show's second year, he switched from being billed as 'Frankie J Holden' to 'Frank Holden'.

In 2009, Holden co-presented, alongside his wife Michelle, Discover Downunder, a half-hour Australia-based travelling/caravanning program for the Nine Network. In 2010, he co-hosted What's Up Down Under on Channel Seven. This show is similar in format to Discover Downunder.

Film
Frankie Holden has starred in films as recent as 2007 with Clubland. He was also in Proof, The Big Steal, Return Home, 
Evil Angels and High Tide. He also had a cameo appearance in Michael Thornhill's 1977 movie The FJ Holden.

Personal life
Holden married his first wife Leigh Hunter in the mid seventies, divorcing in the early eighties. He had 3 daughters from his second marriage, to dancer Melda Rees, who died in 1997 from cancer. He married actress Michelle Pettigrove two years later. They have had one daughter together.
 
Holden currently resides on the Sapphire Coast of New South Wales Australia and is still performing around Australia as a successful entertainer.

In 2010, Frankie and Michelle, with two other couples, purchased Tathra Beachside, a seaside holiday park in Tathra, NSW.

Honours
In 2016, Holden was awarded the Medal of the Order of Australia, in the 2016 Queens Birthday Honours List, for service to the arts as an entertainer, and to the community of the Sapphire Coast.

Frankie J. Holden has a star in Caloundra's "Walk of Stars" between Red Symons and Daryl Somers.

Popular culture
A caricature of Frankie J. Holden appears in the animation Hyper Parsnip Bitches by animator Paul Robertson.

Solo Discography

Singles

References

General
  Note: Archived [on-line] copy has limited functionality.
  Note: [on-line] version established at White Room Electronic Publishing Pty Ltd in 2007 and was expanded from the 2002 edition.

Specific

External links

Tathra Beach Family Park

1952 births
Living people
AACTA Award winners
Australian musicians
Australian television presenters
Australian male singers
Australian male television actors
Recipients of the Medal of the Order of Australia
Ol' 55 (band) members